The Boykos (Rusyn: Бойко, ;), or simply Highlanders (верховинці, verkhovyntsi or ґоралы, g̀oraly), are an ethnolinguistic sub-group of Rusyns located in the Carpathian Mountains of Ukraine, Slovakia, Hungary, and Poland. Along with the neighboring Lemkos and Hutsuls, the Boykos speak a dialect of the Rusyn language. Within Ukraine, the Boykos and other Rusyns are seen as a sub-group of ethnic Ukrainians. Boykos differ from their neighbors in dialect, dress, folk architecture, and customs.

Etymology

Regarding the origin of the name Boyko there exist several etymological hypotheses, but it is generally considered, as explained by priest Joseph Levytsky in his Hramatyka (1831), that it derives from the particle . Specifically, it derives from the exclamation "бой!, бойє!" (< bo-i-je >), meaning "it is really so!", which is often used by the population. The 19th-century scholar Pavel Jozef Šafárik, with whom Franjo Rački and Henry Hoyle Howorth agreed, argued a direct connection of the Boykos with the region of Boiki mentioned in the 10th century De Administrando Imperio, but this thesis is outdated and rejected, as most scholars, Mykhailo Hrushevsky among them, already dismissed it in the 19th century because Boiki is a clear reference to Bohemia, which in turn derives from the Celtic tribe of Boii. The derivation from Boii, is also disputed because there is not enough evidence. They are also called Vrchovints (Highlanders). As in the case of Hutsuls and Lemkos, they are recorded in historical and ethnographic sources since the 18th and 19th century.

Origin

Boykos are considered one of the descendants of East Slavic tribes, specifically White Croats who lived in the region, possibly also Ulichs who arrived from the East, and partly Vlach shepherds who later immigrated from Transylvania.

Demography
In the region inhabited by Boykos, named Boikivshchyna, there lived up to 400,000 people of whom most were Boykos. They also lived in Sanok, Lesko and Przemyśl County of the Podkarpackie Voivodeship in Poland, before the forced relocation in 1947. In commemoration of Boykos, Ukraine's national parliament, the Verkhovna Rada, in 2016 renamed Telmanove Raion into Boykivske Raion where Boykos were deported from Czarna, Bieszczady County (today in Poland) after the 1951 Polish–Soviet territorial exchange. It is estimated from the evidence available that in 1970 there lived 230,000 people of Boyko origin.

In Ukraine, the classification of Boykos and other Rusyns as an ethnicity distinct from Ukrainians is controversial. The deprecated and archaic term Ruthenian, while also derived from Rus', is ambiguous, as it technically may refer to Rusyns and Ukrainians, as well as Belarusians and in some cases Russians, depending on the historical period. According to the 2001 Ukraine census, only 131 people identified themselves as Boykos, separate from Ukrainians. However, this figure is distorted because some people otherwise identifiable as Boykos regard that name as derogatory and call themselves highlanders (verkhovyntsi). This is also on top of many attempts within the USSR and modern day Ukraine to assimilate the Rusyn people into the modern Ukraine state. In the Polish census of 2011, 258 people identified their nationality as Boyko, with 14 people listing it as their only national identification.

Location
Poland: southeasternmost part of Poland (Podkarpackie Voivodeship).
Ukraine: central and western half of the Carpathians in Ukraine across such regions as the southern Lviv Oblast (Stryi, Drohobych, and Sambir Raions), western Ivano-Frankivsk Oblast (Kalush Raion) and parts of the northeastern Zakarpattia Oblast (Mizhhiria Raion)
Northeast Slovakia

To the west of Boykos live Lemkos, east or southeast Hutsuls, northward Dnistrov'yans, Opolyans.

Religion
Most Boykos belong to the Ukrainian Greek Catholic Church, with a minority belonging to the Ukrainian Orthodox Church. The distinctive wooden church architecture of the Boyko region is a three-domed church, with the domes arranged in one line, and the middle dome slightly larger than the others.

Notable people
Yuriy Drohobych (1450–1494), first doctor of medicine in Ukraine, rector of the University of Bologna (1481–1482), professor at Jagiellonian University (1488).
Petro Konashevych-Sahaidachny (1582–1622), Ukrainian political and civic leader, Hetman of Ukrainian Zaporozhian Cossacks (1616–1622).
Ivan Franko (1856–1916), Ukrainian poet, writer and political activist.

See also
Rusyns
Ruthenians
Ukrainians
Boyko Surname

References

External links

Anatoliy Ponomariov. "Ethnic groups of Ukrainians" (in Ukrainian). Available online.
Nakonechny, Ye. "How Ruthenians became Ukrainians", Zerkalo Nedeli (the Mirror Weekly), July, 2005. Available online in Russian and in Ukrainian.
Short photo essay about contemporary Boiko life.
 Romaniuk, K. Characteristics of Boikos dialect use in Kherson region in the mid 20th century. "Domiv". 8 March 2016.

Slavic ethnic groups
Slavic highlanders
Carpathians
Ethnic groups in Ukraine